(short: Ustuf) was a paramilitary rank of the German Schutzstaffel (SS) first created in July 1934. The rank can trace its origins to the older SA rank of Sturmführer which had existed since the founding of the SA in 1921. The rank of Untersturmführer was senior to Hauptscharführer (or Sturmscharführer in the Waffen-SS) and junior to the rank of Obersturmführer.

Overview
Untersturmführer was the first commissioned SS officer rank, equivalent to a second lieutenant in other military organizations. The insignia consisted of a three silver pip collar patch with the shoulder boards of an army lieutenant. Because of the emphasis the SS placed on the leadership of their organization, obtaining the rank of Untersturmführer required a screening and training process different from the standard promotion system in the enlisted ranks.

In the early days of the SS, promotion to Untersturmführer was simply a matter of course as an SS member rose within the enlisted ranks to a position where they were ready to assume the duties of an officer.  Untersturmführer was also occasionally an appointed position, given to an SS member so that they would be able to immediately begin as an officer in the organization.  This was typically the case in security organizations, such as the Gestapo and Sicherheitsdienst (SD).  A typical scenario in the early SS was for a member to join as an SS-Mann and then receive promotion directly to Sturmführer.  In some cases, where an officer was being "groomed" to take up an SS leadership position, an officer could be promoted even higher.  Such was the situation with Friedrich Jeckeln who was promoted directly from Mann to Sturmbannführer.

By 1938, the size and logistics of the SS brought about the need for an established system of becoming an SS officer with this system different for both the Waffen-SS and the general SS formations of the Allgemeine-SS.

Rank insignia

General-SS commissions 

Within the Allgemeine, or "General" SS, promotion to the rank of Untersturmführer required satisfactory service in the enlisted SS ranks with an SS member holding the rank of Hauptscharführer before consideration could be given for an officer's commission.  Those so eligible were required to obtain a recommendation from their SS chain of command followed by submission of a document known as the Lebenslauf.  A résumé of the SS member's career, the Lebenslauf stated why the SS member felt they should be commissioned as an officer and gave, as evidence, a list of chronological accomplishments both within the SS and before joining.

Following a racial and political background check, the SS member's service record would be reviewed, with the Lebenslauf and all SS evaluations screened by the SS personnel office (known as the SS Personalhauptamt).  If found eligible for promotion, the potential SS officer's name would be forwarded to Heinrich Himmler for final approval of commission.

Between 1934 and 1938, Himmler personally reviewed all candidates for promotion to the rank of Untersturmführer.  However, during the Second World War, manpower constraints and logistics prevented Himmler from screening all SS officer applicants and the task typically fell to subordinates.

Waffen-SS commissions

Becoming an officer in the Waffen-SS could be a difficult and time-consuming process.  All candidates for commissions in the Waffen-SS were required to attend SS-Junkerschulen (SS-Junker Schools), which were training camps established to train future Waffen-SS officers. The most well known of these academies was located at Bad Tölz, Bavaria.

To be admitted into an SS Junkerschule a prospective officer must have served in the enlisted ranks of the Waffen-SS and must have been recommended for a commission by his superiors. Those who were recommended were physically screened as well as politically and racially investigated to ensure pure Germanic and Aryan heritage.  If approved for admittance to an SS Junkerschule, the SS member was appointed to the first of a series of SS officer candidate ranks which displayed the same insignia as senior SS non-commissioned officers.  The following was the promotion tier of Waffen-SS officer candidate ranks:

{| style="border:1px solid #8888aa; background-color:#f7f8ff; padding:5px; font-size:95%; margin: 0px 12px 12px 0px;"
|-align="center"
| SS officer candidate rank()
| SS enlisted equivalent(Unterführer)
|-align="center"
| Standartenoberjunker FA 
| Hauptscharführer|-
|
|-
|align="center"| Standartenjunker FA 
|align="center"|  Oberscharführer|-
|
|-
|align="center"| Oberjunker FA 
|align="center"|  Scharführer|-
|
|-
|align="center"| Junker FA
|align="center"|  Unterscharführer|-
|}
Advancement through the SS officer candidate ranks required passing physical screenings, written examinations, and displaying military tactical and leadership traits under observation.  Upon reaching the rank of Standartenoberjunker, an SS officer candidate was permitted to wear the silver chin strap of an SS officer, and was assigned to a field unit for final field training and evaluation.

Upon completion of all training, the SS officer candidate was incorporated (introduced) into the SS officer corps in a special ceremony with officer insignia and SS sword presented.  The entire process of training to become a Waffen-SS officer typically required ten to sixteen months to complete.

Field commissions

As World War II drew to a close, and losses within the armed forces began to rise, the strictness of admission to the SS officer corps began to grow lax. By 1945, it was a common occurrence for local Waffen-SS field commanders to grant promotions to the rank of Untersturmführer when battlefield manpower needs required it. Within the Allgemeine-SS, in particular the security forces of the RSHA, promotions to Untersturmführer'' still required careful scrutiny and there were SS members awaiting approval of commissions as late as April 1945.

See also
 Table of ranks and insignia of the Waffen-SS

Notes

Bibliography 

 
 
 

SS ranks